Winifred Lewellin James (20 March 1876 – 27 April 1941) was an Australian writer. As a novelist, travel writer and journalist, James's career began with her first novel published in 1907. During her time in London, she lost her Australian nationality and after a fight extending over many years, regained her nationality in 1935. Her final novel The Gods Arrive, was published in Melbourne shortly after her death in 1941.

Biography
James, daughter of the Rev. Thomas James and Gertrude (née Peterson), was born at Prahran, near Melbourne, Victoria in 1876.

She took up journalism in Melbourne, and in 1905, at the age of 29, went to London where her first novel Bachelor Betty was published in 1907. It was followed by Patricia Baring in 1908, Saturday's Children: An Australian Book for Girls in 1909, and Letters to my Son, 1910. This book had extraordinary success and reached an eighteenth edition in less than 10 years. More Letters to My Son, Letters of a Spinster, and A Sweeping came out in 1911. Three travel books followed, The Mulberry Tree (1913), A Woman in the Wilderness (1915), and Out of the Shadows (1924). A novel, Three Births in the Hemingway Family, was published in 1929, and in the following year two volumes of essays London is My Lute and A Man for England, which was also issued with the title A Man for Empire.

Another book of travel, Gangways and Corridors, appeared in 1936. Miss James married in 1913 Henry de Jan of Louisiana, U.S.A., and Panama. The marriage was unfortunate and some years later Mrs de Jan divorced her husband. She returned to London and found that she had lost her nationality, and that she was an alien who must report to the police whenever she moved more than five miles from her residence. She eventually refused to report and after a fight extending over many years regained her nationality in 1935. She returned to Australia early in 1940, in ill health, and died in Sydney on 27 April 1941. Another novel, The Gods Arrive, was published in Melbourne shortly after her death.

References

Sources
 Sally O'Neill, James, Winifred Llewellyn (1876–1941) in Dictionary of Australian Biography
 Winifred James at AustLit

1876 births
1941 deaths
20th-century Australian novelists
Australian travel writers
Australian women novelists
Women travel writers
20th-century Australian women writers
People from Prahran, Victoria
Writers from Melbourne
People who lost Australian citizenship